Catolobus is a genus of flowering plants belonging to the family Brassicaceae.

Its native range is Eastern Europe to Temperate Asia.

Species:
 Catolobus pendulus (L.) Al-Shehbaz

References

Brassicaceae
Brassicaceae genera